In the winter of 2001, Elton John and Billy Joel toured with their Face to Face concert series. The tour started in Honolulu, Hawaii (where they had not performed together before). The first leg of the tour closed at the MGM Grand Garden Arena in Paradise, Nevada on 17 and 18 February.

The tour resumed on 9 April in Denver and the 2001 performances closed at the Target Center in Minneapolis on 15 and 16 May.

John and Joel performed the 'Face To Face' concerts again the following year. Joel stated in 2012 that he would no longer tour with John because of setlist constraints.

Tour dates

Box office score data

References

External links

 Information Site with Tour Dates

2001 concert tours
Billy Joel concert tours
Co-headlining concert tours
Elton John concert tours